The Trifthorn is a mountain of the Swiss Pennine Alps, located west of Zermatt in the canton of Valais. It is located in the middle of the ridge connecting the Ober Gabelhorn from the Zinalrothorn.

References

External links
Trifthorn on Hikr

Mountains of the Alps
Alpine three-thousanders
Mountains of Valais
Mountains of Switzerland